Cristian Nicușor Pușcaș (born 20 January 1994) is a Romanian professional footballer who plays as a midfielder for Politehnica Iași. In his career Pușcaș also played for teams such as: Steaua II București, FC Gloria Buzău, Metalul Reșița and Dunărea Călărași, among others.

Honours
Steaua București
Liga I: 2012–13

Dunărea Călărași
Liga II: 2017–18

UTA Arad
Liga II: 2019–20

References

External links
 
 

1994 births
Living people
People from Reghin
Romanian footballers
Association football midfielders
Romania youth international footballers
Liga I players
FC Steaua București players
Liga II players
FC Steaua II București players
FC Gloria Buzău players
LPS HD Clinceni players
CS Sportul Snagov players
FC Dunărea Călărași players
FC Petrolul Ploiești players
FC UTA Arad players
AFC Turris-Oltul Turnu Măgurele players
FC Politehnica Iași (2010) players
1. deild karla players
Romanian expatriate footballers
Romanian expatriate sportspeople in Iceland
Expatriate footballers in Iceland